Oyan Nazariani is an Azerbaijani Beach wrestling and Greco-Roman wrestler born in Urmia. He has been playing for the Azerbaijani national wrestling team since 2014. He won a gold medal at the international Golden Grand Prix tournament in Baku in 2016, and a silver medal at the 2017 Greco-Roman Wrestling World Cup in Abadan, Iran. He is a five-time national champion. In 2019, he was awarded a gold medal at the World Beach Wrestling Championship in Zagreb, Croatia. Since 2020, he is the head coach of the Azerbaijani beach wrestling team.

Personal life and education  
Oyan Nazariani was born in 1994 in the city of Urmia, West Azerbaijan Province. After graduating from high school in Urmia, he studied law at Mahabad Azad University.

Career 
He has been wrestling since 2003. In 2011, he took third place in the Iranian youth championship. After that, he was invited to the Iranian wrestling team. In 2013, he won a bronze medal as a member of the Iranian national team at the Salvation Tournament in Kahramanmaras, Turkey. He moved to Azerbaijan in 2014 and began to represent Azerbaijan in tournaments. In 2014, he won a gold medal at the national championship among youth in Azerbaijan, a silver medal at the international tournament for the AWF Cup, a gold medal at the international tournament for the Nakhchivan Cup, and a silver medal at the international tournament in Dagestan. Later that year, he competed at the European Junior Wrestling Championships in Katowice, Poland, and at the World Junior Wrestling Championships in Zagreb, Croatia. In 2015, he participated in the U-23 European Wrestling Championship in Walbrzych, Poland, won a silver medal at the European Wrestling Cup in Moscow, Russia, and a gold medal at the Azerbaijani Championship. In 2016, he finished third in the European Nations Cup and first in the Golden Grand Prix international tournament. He won a silver medal at the 2017 Greco-Roman Wrestling World Cup in Abadan, Iran. In 2015, 2016, 2017, and 2018, he became the champion of Azerbaijan in the weight category of 130 kg. In February 2019, he took second place in the Vehbi Emre and Hamit Kaplan Memorial Tournament in Istanbul, Turkey, and won a silver medal. In September 2019, Oyan Nazariani won the world championship cup in the finals of the Beach Wrestling World Series in Zagreb, Croatia.

Coaching career 
On September 21, 2020, he was appointed head coach of the Azerbaijani beach wrestling team. On September 11, 2021, the European Junior Beach Wrestling Championship was held in Katerini, Greece. Under the leadership of Oyan Nazariani, each of the four athletes representing Azerbaijan at the championship was awarded various medals. They won a total of 2 gold, 1 silver and 1 bronze medal. The national team of Azerbaijan took the third place in the team event among juniors in this competition.

On September 26, 2021, the World Junior Beach Wrestling Championship was held in Constanța, Romania. Each of the four athletes representing Azerbaijan at the championship, led by Oyan Nazariani, was awarded various medals. They won a total of 2 gold and 2 silver medals. Among juniors, they were awarded third place in the team standings.

Oyan Nazariani and Ibrahim Yusubov each won silver medals at the World Beach Wrestling Championship among adults held in Constanța, Romania on September 25–26, 2021.

Major results

References

External links
Performance at the 2016 World Cup
Performance at the 2016 Golden Grand Prix
The final match of the 2018 Azerbaijan Championship
Beach wrestling 1/2 final match in 2019
The final match of Beach Wrestling in 2019

1994 births
People from Urmia
Azerbaijani male sport wrestlers
Living people